Palais des Sports (French: Palace of Sports) is a generic name of comprehensive indoors sports venue, mostly in the French-speaking world, including:

 France
Palais des Sports de Beaulieu, Nantes
Palais des sports Ghani-Yalouz, Besançon
Palais des Sports Jean-Michel Geoffroy, Dijon
Palais des Sports de Beaublanc, Limoges
Palais des Sports de Gerland, Lyon
Palais des Sports, Grenoble
Palais des Sports de Marseille
Palais des Sports Jean Weille, Nancy
Palais des Sports Maurice Thorez, Nanterre
Palais des Sports, Orléans
Palais des Sports, Paris in Porte de Versailles (XVe arrondissement)
Palais des Sports de Pau
Palais des Sports de Toulon
 Palais des sports André-Brouat, Toulouse

 Québec, Canada
Palais des Sports Léopold-Drolet, Sherbrooke
 Palais des Sports, Val d'Or

 Greece
Palais des Sports (Kallithea)
Palais des Sports (Thessaloniki), an alternate name for the Alexandreio Melathron Nick Galis Hall arena in Thessaloniki

 Ivory Coast
Palais des Sports de Treichville, Abidjan

 Republic of the Congo
Palais des Sports (Kintélé), Brazzaville

See also 
Palace of Sports in Anglophone countries,
Palacio de los Deportes in Hispanophone countries,
Palazzo dello Sport in Italophone countries.